Erie Creek Provincial Park is a provincial park in British Columbia, Canada, about 15 hectares in size. It is a protected area because of the wildlife it hosts.

References

Provincial parks of British Columbia
Regional District of Central Kootenay
Year of establishment missing